Igor Pretnar (3 April 1924 – 8 April 1977) was a Slovenian film director. 

Pretnar won the Golden Arena for Best Director for his film Wild Growth (Samorastniki, 1963) at the 1963 Pula Film Festival. His 1976 film Idealist was entered into the 10th Moscow International Film Festival.

Selected filmography
Five Minutes of Paradise (Pet minuta raja, 1959)
Wild Growth (Samorastniki, 1963)
Idealist (1976)

References

External links

Igor Pretnar at the Slovenian Film Fund website 

Slovenian film directors
1924 births
1977 deaths
Film people from Ljubljana
Prešeren Award laureates
Golden Arena for Best Director winners
Yugoslav film directors